The Willow Creek Border Crossing connects the cities of Havre, Montana and Govenlock, Saskatchewan on the Canada–United States border. It is reached by Montana Secondary Highway 233 on the American side and Saskatchewan Highway 21 on the Canadian side. Canada replaced its 1974 border station at this crossing with a modular unit in 2015.  The US replaced its border inspection facilities in 2012.  These facilities were originally built in 1962.  Prior to that time, people entering the US at this location were expected to travel to Havre to report for inspection.  The last 10 miles of the road between Havre and the Canada–US border were unpaved as recently as 2000.

See also
 List of Canada–United States border crossings

References

Canada–United States border crossings
1962 establishments in Montana
1962 establishments in Saskatchewan
Buildings and structures in Hill County, Montana
Transportation in Hill County, Montana
Reno No. 51, Saskatchewan
Division No. 4, Saskatchewan